John Mulligan may refer to:

John Mulligan (musician), English new wave musician
John Mulligan (baseball), Major League Baseball third baseman
John W. Mulligan (1774-1862), attorney, Friedrich Wilhelm von Steuben's secretary and U.S. Consul in Athens.